Chlamydia is a sexually transmitted infection caused by the bacterium Chlamydia trachomatis.

Chlamydia may also refer to: 
Chlamydia (genus), a genus of pathogenic bacteria
 Chlamydia trachomatis, causing human sexually transmitted disease and eye infections
 Chlamydia muridarum, causing disease in mice and hamsters (the Muridae)
 Chlamydia suis, infects pigs (Sus scrofa)
 Chlamydia psittaci, causes parrot fever

See also
 Chlamydiia, class of bacteria including Chlamydiaceae

Chlamydophila, another genus of pathogenic bacteria
 Chlamydophila abortus, a chlamydial species that causes abortion in mammals
 Chlamydophila caviae, a chlamydial species found in Guinea pigs
 Chlamydophila felis, a chlamydial species found in cats
 Chlamydophila pecorum, a chlamydial species common in livestock
 Chlamydophila pneumoniae, also known as Chlamydia pneumoniae, an airborne chlamydial species responsible for human respiratory infection and numerous animal infections
 Chlamydophila psittaci, a highly virulent chlamydial species prevalent in birds